Zunaid Ahmed Palak (born 17 May 1980) is a Bangladeshi politician, and the incumbent Member of Bangladesh Levgistvie CouncilNatore-3.

Early life and education
Palak was born on 17 May 1980 to a Bengali Muslim family in the village of Serkol-Teligram in Singra, Natore District, Bangladesh. Through his parents, Faiz Ahmad and Jamila Ahmad, he is linked with the Singranatore dynasty of Mughal descent.

He received his SSC from Singra Damdama Pilot High School in 1995, and his HSC from Rajshahi Old Degree College in 1997. He then studied political science at the Dhaka College and gained an LLB from the National University, Bangladesh.

Career
Palak was appointed as a Minister of State for Information and Communication Technology Division, Bangladesh on 12 January 2014 at the age of 34 years making him the youngest Minister of Bangladesh, he is also the first minister ever to be born in the independent Bangladesh. He was nominated Young Global Leader in 2016 by the World Economic Forum. At the age of 26, he got the nomination from Bangladesh Awami League, in the National Elections of 2006. In 2008 he was nominated again, and was elected  by a big margin, becoming the youngest member of the ninth National Assembly of Bangladesh. In June 2017 he was nominated as Chairman of the Advisory Committee of International Association of Students in Economic and Commercial Sciences (AIESEC), Bangladesh chapter. In his early twenties, he followed his father's footsteps in politics and became a member of the Bangladesh Awami League party.

Ahmed also was a committee member where he planned to incorporate "Green Technologies" into its office building principles, to reduce carbon emissions into the environment. He said that the building of offices and residences using green technology would not release any carbon to the environment, while the wastes of houses and offices will be recycled and to produce energy. He also expressed that a delegation from India was on their way to discuss different technological issues including the building of zero carbon emitting buildings. He further added:

Palak has been President of the Bangladesh Carrom Federation since 2009, and Vice President of the International Carrom Federation since 2011.

References

External links
 Official Website of Zunaid Ahmed Palak
 List of Bangladesh Parliament Members
 List of Bangladesh Parliament Members (Bengali) 
 Activity Report of All Party Parliamentary Group (APPG) on Climate Change and Environment

1980 births
Living people
People from Natore District
Awami League politicians
Rajshahi College alumni
Dhaka College alumni
State Ministers of Information (Bangladesh)
State Ministers of Posts, Telecommunications and Information Technology
9th Jatiya Sangsad members
10th Jatiya Sangsad members
11th Jatiya Sangsad members
Carrom people
Bangladeshi people of Mughal descent